Hasford is a surname. Notable people with the surname include:

 Gustav Hasford (1947–1993), American journalist, writer, and poet
 Jason Hasford (born 1971), English footballer
 Joerg Hasford (born 1950), German physician, biometrician, and epidemiologist

See also
 Basford (surname)